Grace Episcopal Church is a historic church at 1115 36th Street in Galveston, Texas.

It was built in 1894 and added to the National Register in 1975.

See also

National Register of Historic Places listings in Galveston County, Texas
Recorded Texas Historic Landmarks in Galveston County

References

External links

Episcopal churches in Texas
Churches on the National Register of Historic Places in Texas
National Register of Historic Places in Galveston County, Texas
Gothic Revival church buildings in Texas
Churches completed in 1895
19th-century Episcopal church buildings
Churches in Galveston, Texas
Recorded Texas Historic Landmarks